Eusebio Monzó Alfonso (born 4 December 2000) is a Spanish footballer who plays for UD San Sebastián de los Reyes, on loan from SD Huesca. Mainly a central defender, he can also play as a left back.

Club career
Born in Valencia, Monzó was a Levante UD youth graduate. In 2018, he spent several months sidelined due to a knee injury, and after fully recovering, he was promoted to the reserve team ahead of the 2019–20 campaign.

On 17 January 2020, Levante announced the loan of Monzó to Tercera División side CF Intercity, but he moved on loan to Segunda División B side CF La Nucía late in the month instead. He returned to his parent club in July after making no appearances, and was again assigned to Levante's B-side.

On 21 July 2021, Monzó moved to SD Huesca and was initially assigned to the B-team in Segunda División RFEF. He made his first team debut on 29 May of the following year, coming on as a late substitute for Pablo Insua in a 0–3 Segunda División away loss against Real Valladolid.

On 4 January 2023, Monzó was loaned to Primera Federación side UD San Sebastián de los Reyes for the remainder of the season.

References

External links

2000 births
Living people
Footballers from Valencia (city)
Spanish footballers
Association football defenders
Segunda División players
Segunda División B players
Segunda Federación players
Atlético Levante UD players
CF La Nucía players
SD Huesca B players
SD Huesca footballers
UD San Sebastián de los Reyes players